Accelerator (formerly Ben 10 - Ultimate Mission) is a steel Family Boomerang roller coaster at Drayton Manor Resort.

Description 

The ride is a prototype steel Vekoma Family Boomerang roller coaster. The ride features one lift hill driven by wheels that release the train into a curving figure 8 layout that concludes up a tower with a hump. Upon reaching the top of the tower the coaster train goes through the layout in reverse to the station.

History 

 2010 - Ride was officially announced by the park 

 April 21, 2011 - Ride opened 
 2016 - Ride was renamed to Accelerator, after the sponsorship from Cartoon Network ended

See also
 2011 in amusement parks

References 

Roller coasters in the United Kingdom